Luís Vaz Pereira Pinto Guedes, 2nd Viscount of Montalegre, was a Portuguese soldier, who served on the absolutist side in Portugal's Liberal Wars.

He was born in Vila Real, on August 10, 1770, and became a member of the Royal Household ("moço-fidalgo") by a decree of December 20, 1778.

He succeeded his father-in-law as 2nd Viscount of Montalegre by a royal decree of July 3, 1823. 

As the military commander in Trás-os-Montes in 1823, he raised a rebellion in the name of the absolutist prince, Infante Dom Miguel of Portugal. During the civil war between Dom Miguel and his elder brother, the former Emperor Dom Pedro I of Brazil, he was a prominent Miguelite general: he was in joint command of the Miguelite army at the Battle of Ponte Ferreira, and was the Miguelite commander at the Battle of Asseiceira in which Miguel's cause was finally defeated.

After the war ended, he was cashiered from the army in 1834. He wrote memoirs justifying his actions, and died in 1841.

References 

1770 births
1841 deaths
Viscounts of Portugal
Portuguese soldiers
Portuguese nobility
Military personnel of the Liberal Wars
18th-century Portuguese people
19th-century Portuguese people
People from Vila Real, Portugal
Portuguese military personnel of the Napoleonic Wars